Bandari music stems from Iran's south, around the Persian Gulf region.

Music
It is a rhythmic type of dance music played in fast and slow tempos. The music includes vocals and instruments. It is played during celebrations such as weddings.

The definition of the word “bandari” means “of the port” is a derivation of the Persian word bandar, meaning port.

Instruments
The major musical instruments used in the Bandari style include the nei anban (a bagpipe instrument made of goat's skin), the tombak (a percussion instrument made of animal skin and the wood of the walnut tree), the daf (a percussion instrument made of animal skin and a wooden frame like the head of a drum, with jingles on the rim, similar to the tambourine), and the darbuka (a percussion instrument made of fish skin and clay).

Modern Persian Bandari bands use rhythmic instruments such as the frame drum, darbuka, djembe, talking drum, quinto, conga, and acoustic and electric drums specialized in 6/8 rhythms.

References

External links
 The Iranian: Bandari, by Azam Nemati, 2003 l
 Bandari

Persian music
Persian Gulf music